Advanced Photovoltaic and Electronics Experiments, also known as APEX, was a satellite-based science mission launched into Low Earth orbit on August 3, 1994, by a Pegasus rocket. The mission successfully tested the use of photovoltaic and electronic components in space.

References 

Satellites of the United States
Spacecraft launched in 1994
Spacecraft launched by Pegasus rockets